Global Touring Challenge: Africa (abbreviated GTC: Africa) is a 2001 racing video game for PlayStation 2 developed by Rage Software.

Reception 

The game received "mixed" reviews according to the review aggregation website Metacritic. In Japan, where the game was ported and published by Success on December 19, 2002, Famitsu gave it a score of 26 out of 40.

References

External links 
 

2001 video games
Majesco Entertainment games
PlayStation 2 games
PlayStation 2-only games
Racing video games
Rage Games games
Success (company) games
Video games developed in the United Kingdom
Video games set in Africa
Video games set in Botswana
Video games set in South Africa
Video games set in Zimbabwe